Heimdall Glacier is a small glacier just east of Siegfried Peak and Siegmund Peak on the south side of Wright Valley in the Asgard Range of Victoria Land, Antarctica. The name, given by the New Zealand Antarctic Place-Names Committee, is one in a group derived from Norse mythology, Heimdall being the warden of Asgard.

References

Glaciers of McMurdo Dry Valleys